Kuzgun is a Turkish thriller television series that started to be broadcast on Star TV on 13 February 2019, written by Burcu Görgün Toptaş and Özlem Yılmaz, directed by Bahadır İnce and starring Barış Arduç and Burcu Biricik. It ended with the 21st episode released on 16 October 2019, by making a final..The show premiered in South Africa as Voelvry

Plot 
Kuzgun is an 8-year-old boy whose father is a trusted police officer.  He has a happy and modest life together with his parents, brothers and sisters. On a night when Kuzgun's father, Yusuf, and his colleague Rifat are on a mission to capture Sheref, a drug lord. The sheriff offers a bribe to Yusuf, but he refuses, however Rifat accepts and betrays his colleague. After that he becomes Sheref's right arm, while Kuzgun's father goes to jail.

The baron's gang demands a tape and goes after Yusuf's family. They take Kuzgun, but the latter manages to escape from them. He can not find his family at home and has to survive on the streets.

20 years later, Kuzgun is ready for revenge. An ordinary person advises Kuzgun to forget all the pains during childhood. Yet Kuzgun prefers not to forget and transform himself into a sword of revenge.

Kuzgun makes a plan to join the Rifat gang and then become the most powerful man in Istanbul. To achieve the goal he goes after his daughter, Dila.  Dila is a girl who lives in London and works as a lawyer. She does not accept the work of her father Rifat and her brother Ali. She knows that her family's wealth comes from her father's illegal work.

To meet Dila, Kuzgun becomes her bodyguard without revealing his identity and saves her life. After that, he gains her trust and with her help, he starts working in Rifat's gang.

Unlike other revenge stories, Kuzgun reveals his identity from the first meeting. He clearly shows that he has endured the pain for 20 years and now wants his share and that of his father in the drug business.

Cast and Characters

Main characters

Supporting characters

Broadcast calendar

References

External links 
  on Star TV's official site.

Star TV (Turkey) original programming
2019 Turkish television series debuts
Turkish drama television series
2019 Turkish television series endings
Television series by Ay Yapım